The Mitsubishi J4M Senden (閃電 "Flashing Lightning") or Navy Experimental 17-Shi Otsu B Type Interceptor Fighter Senden, Allied reporting name Luke, was a  Japanese World War II fighter aircraft proposed by Mitsubishi Heavy Industries for use by the Imperial Japanese Navy. The J4M project did not proceed beyond the design stage.

Design and development

To provide the Imperial Japanese Navy with a land-based high-performance interceptor aircraft, Mitsubishi designed the J4M. It was to have been a single-seat, twin-boom, low-wing monoplane with a central nacelle housing an unstepped cockpit and a 1,590-kilowatt (2,130-hp) Mitsubishi Ha-43 radial engine behind the pilot driving a four-bladed pusher propeller rotating between the booms. The booms were to extend aft from the leading edge of the wing and were mounted below the central nacelle. The aircraft was to have had tricycle landing gear and an armament of one 30-mm and two 20-mm cannon.

Design of the initial J4M1 version ended when the Navy put its support behind the competing Kyūshū J7W fighter, and Mitsubishi did not build a prototype. The Allies nonetheless assigned the J4M the reporting name "Luke" during World War II.

Specifications (J4M estimated)
{{Aircraft specs
|ref=Japanese Secret Projects:Experimental aircraft of the IJA and IJN 1939-1945
|prime units?=met

|crew=1
|length m=12.98
|span m=12.49
|height m=3.47
|wing area sqm=22
|empty weight kg=3,400
|gross weight kg=4,400
|max takeoff weight kg=5,255

|eng1 number=1
|eng1 name=Mitsubishi MK9D
|eng1 type=18-cyl. two-row fan assisted air-cooled radial piston engine
|eng1 kw=
|eng1 hp=2,100
|eng1 note= at take-off
 at  
 at 

|prop blade number=6
|prop name=metal constant speed propeller
|prop dia m=3.2

|perfhide=

|max speed kmh=756
|max speed note=at 
|cruise speed kmh=462
|cruise speed note=
'Landing speed:  
|endurance=2 hours 12 minutes
|ceiling m=12,000
|climb rate ms=8.89
|time to altitude=  in 15 minutes
|wing loading kg/m2=199.69

|guns= 1x 30mm Type 5 cannon with 100 rounds + 2x 20mm Type 99 cannon with 200 rounds per gun in the fuselage nose
|bombs= provision for 2x  or 2x  bombs
}}

See also

References

Notes

Bibliography
 Francillon, René J. Japanese Aircraft of the Pacific War''. Annapolis, Maryland: Naval Institute Press, 1979. .

External links
 - Artist's impression at j-aircraft.com

J4M, Mitsubishi
J4M
J4M, Mitsubishi
J4M, Mitsubishi